Athletics at the 2014 Summer Youth Olympics was held from 20 to 26 August at the Nanjing Olympic Sports Center in Nanjing, China.

Qualification
Each National Olympic Committee (NOC) could enter a maximum of 36 athletes, 18 per each gender and 1 per each event. As hosts, China is given 2 quotas, 1 per each gender and 136 places. 68 spots per each gender was decided by the Tripartite Commission. The remaining 540 places were divided evenly among the individual events and were decided among a single continental qualification event for each continent with the exception of the Americas in which they hosted three. The amount of quotas available to each continent for each event was decided on the results from the 2011 World Youth Championships and 2013 World Youth Championships.

To be eligible to participate at the Youth Olympics athletes must have been born between 1 January 1997 and 31 December 1998.

Qualification timeline

Quota distribution

Boys

Girls

Schedule

The schedule was released by the Nanjing Youth Olympic Games Organizing Committee.  In the table below, M stands for morning (begins 09:00), A for afternoon (begins 16:00) and E stands for evening (begins 18:30).

All times are CST (UTC+8)

Medal summary

Medal table
 Nanjing 2014 Final Athletics Results

Results

Boys' events

Girls' events

Mixed events

Participating nations

169 nations participated in athletics.

References

External links
Official Results Book – Athletics

 
2014
2014 Summer Youth Olympics events
Youth Summer Olympics
2014 Youth Olympics